Rudolph Grey is a musician and the biographer of filmmaker Ed Wood.

As an electric guitarist, Grey has recorded and performed with Mars, under his own name, as well as leading various ad hoc ensembles called The Blue Humans. His music draws on no wave and free jazz.

Grey is also a motion picture historian and has written Nightmare of Ecstasy (1992), a biography of Ed Wood, the director of notoriously awful cult films. Tim Burton's film Ed Wood was based on Grey's book.

In 2001, Grey rediscovered a copy of Ed Wood's final feature-length film, Necromania, which had been presumed to be lost, in a Los Angeles warehouse.

In 2011, Grey produced a one-hour documentary called Dad Made Dirty Movies, about the life and career of 1960s porn film producer Stephen Apostolof, detailing his co-productions with filmmaker Ed Wood.

Discography

Mars

Rudolph Grey

Blue Humans

Red Transistor

Recordings of sessions led by others

Bibliography
Published works include:
 1992: Nightmare of Ecstasy: The Life and Art of Edward D. Wood Jr., Feral House, ; reprinted 1994,  – Biography of Ed Wood

References

External links
 
 

Year of birth missing (living people)
Living people
American experimental guitarists
American male guitarists
American biographers
American male biographers
No wave musicians